Wallingford is a town in Rutland County, Vermont, United States. The population was 2,129 at the 2020 census. Wallingford also contains the villages of East Wallingford and South Wallingford.

Geography

Demographics

At the 2000 census there were 2,274 people, 905 households, and 651 families in the town.  The population density was 52.6 people per square mile (20.3/km2).  There were 1,040 housing units at an average density of 24.1 per square mile (9.3/km2).  The racial makeup of the town was 98.86% White, 0.13% Black or African American, 0.22% Asian, 0.04% Pacific Islander, 0.04% from other races, and 0.70% from two or more races. Hispanic or Latino of any race were 0.53%.

Of the 905 households 30.8% had children under the age of 18 living with them, 59.0% were married couples living together, 9.1% had a female householder with no husband present, and 28.0% were non-families. 22.9% of households were one person and 10.6% were one person aged 65 or older.  The average household size was 2.49 and the average family size was 2.92.

The age distribution was 23.4% under the age of 18, 5.8% from 18 to 24, 27.0% from 25 to 44, 30.3% from 45 to 64, and 13.7% 65 or older.  The median age was 42 years. For every 100 females, there were 96.2 males.  For every 100 females age 18 and over, there were 94.1 males.

The median household income was $42,417 and the median family income  was $47,007. Males had a median income of $33,162 versus $24,141 for females. The per capita income for the town was $19,570.  About 3.8% of families and 5.9% of the population were below the poverty line, including 5.1% of those under age 18 and 11.4% of those age 65 or over.

Notable people 

 Ella Maria Ballou, educator, stenographer
 Samuel T. Douglass, Michigan Supreme Court justice
 Paul P. Harris, lawyer and founder of Rotary International
 Matthew Lyon, lawyer, soldier, and United States Representative-Kentucky and Vermont

References

External links
 Town of Wallingford official website
 Virtual Vermont: Wallingford page

 
Towns in Vermont
Towns in Rutland County, Vermont